Mark Ledford (1960 – November 1, 2004) was an American trumpeter, singer, and guitarist. He was known for his multi-instrumentalism and his membership in the Pat Metheny Group.

Music career
Ledford grew up in Detroit and attended Berklee College of Music between 1978 and 1982. After he graduated, he took a job in advertising while doing session work with Stephanie Mills, Jon Hendricks, Special EFX, Michael Brecker, Kevin Eubanks, Don Byron, Living Colour, Prince, and Bill Evans. He would also later contribute to the soundtracks for the Spike Lee films Mo' Better Blues and Do the Right Thing.

In 1986, he began a working relationship with Pat Metheny, appearing live with the Pat Metheny Group and on recordings, such as Secret Story and Still Life (Talking). He also worked with Bobby McFerrin's a cappella group, Circle.

Between 1990 and 1992, Ledford taught master classes in trumpet at the Banff Centre in Alberta, Canada. In 1998, he released a solo album, Miles 2 Go, a tribute to Miles Davis.

On November 1, 2004, Ledford died of heart disease in Los Angeles.

Discography
With Uri Caine
 Love Fugue: Robert Schumann (Winter & Winter, 2000)
With Faith Evans
 Faith (Bad Boy, 1995)
With Joe Locke
 Longing (Timeless, 1990)
With Pat Metheny Group
 Still Life (Talking) (Geffen, 1987)
 We Live Here (Geffen, 1995)
 Imaginary Day (Warner Bros., 1997)
With Pat Metheny
 Secret Story (Geffen, 1992)With The Rippingtons Black Diamond (Windham Hill, 1997)With Special EFX'''
 "Global Village" (GRP,1992)

References

External links
 Mark Ledford obituary
 [ All-Music Guide entry]

1960 births
2004 deaths
American trumpeters
American male trumpeters
American blues guitarists
American male guitarists
American jazz drummers
Pat Metheny Group members
20th-century American singers
20th-century American guitarists
20th-century American drummers
American male drummers
20th-century trumpeters
20th-century American male singers
American male jazz musicians